Joaquín Sorolla García vestido de blanco is an 1896 oil on canvas painting by the Spanish painter Joaquín Sorolla.

The painting is part of the collection of the Sorolla Museum, in Madrid, Spain. It was painted in 1896 and has a size of 85 × 65 cm. In 1951, the painter's son, Joaquín Sorolla García, donated the painting to the Sorolla Museum's Foundation, continuing the practice of his parents of supporting the museum.

Description 
The painting is a child portrait of a boy, the painter's son, Joaquín Sorolla García. He is seen sitting on a wooden sofa, clad in a white dress (a full sleeve white suit), posing for the painting, his left arm rests on the armrest while his right hand rests on his legs. The portrait is made brighter by the colourful grey, mauve and light brown curtain in the background.

This was not the first time Joaquín Sorolla had painted members of his family. He had produced many portraits of his family before, such as of his wife, Clotilde García del Castillo and even his ancestors. His son Joaquin also appears, for example, in the portrait Mi familia along with his wife Clotilde and his daughters María and Elena. In the year 1917, he again painted a portrait of his now adult son, Joaquín Sorolla García, entitled Joaquín Sorolla García sentado that was exhibited at the Sorolla Museum. Another portrait of his son was Joaquín Sorolla García y su perro.

References 

1896 paintings
Paintings by Joaquín Sorolla
Paintings in the collection of the Sorolla Museum